Solieriaceae is a family of red algae in the order Gigartinales.

Type species - Solieria

Genera
As accepted by AlgaeBase;
 Agardhiella  -	5 spp.
 Betaphycus  - 2 spp.
 Eucheuma  - 26 spp.
 Eucheumatopsis  - 2 spp.
 Euryomma  - 1 sp.
 Flahaultia  - 3 spp.
 Gardneriella  - 1 sp.
 Kappaphycopsis  - 1 sp.
 Kappaphycus  - 5 spp.
 Melanema  - 1 sp.
 Meristotheca  - 16 spp.
 Mimica  - 2 spp.
 Sarcodiotheca  - 12 spp.
 Sarconema  - 3 spp.
 Solieria  - 10 spp.
 Tacanoosca  - 1 sp.
 Tepoztequiella  - 2 spp.
 Tikvahiella  - 1 sp.
 Wurdemannia - 1 sp.

References

External links

 
Red algae families